Doğanca may refer to the following villages in Turkey:

 Doğanca, Araç
 Doğanca, Gazipaşa
 Doğanca, Samsat